Douglas Alexander "Duggie" Brown (born 21 March 1958) is a former footballer who played as a forward for Sheffield United. Born in England, he played for the Australia B national team.

Born in Poole in Dorset, Brown started his career in Scotland where he was signed by Aberdeen on 16 July 1976 but failed to make the breakthrough into the first team.  On May 17, 1978 he moved to Clydebank for a short spell before being signed by English side Sheffield United on 2 March 1979, making his league debut the following day in a 1–1 draw against Oldham Athletic.

Described by the press as an 'enthusiastic' player Brown was unable to establish himself as a first team player and eventually left United in October 1980 after playing 31 games in total and scoring five goals.

Following his departure from United, Brown returned to his former trade as an engineering fitter. Brown worked for his father, George Brown, who was a building sub-contractor. George Brown had also been a Football League player, with Southport and Bradford Park Avenue.

Honours

Club
Domestic with South Melbourne
National Soccer League
Champions: 1984
Conference Winners: 1984, 1985
Buffalo Gold Cup
Winners: 1984
Hellenic Cup
Winners: 1984

Individual
National Soccer League Top Goalscorer
1983 – 16 goals
1984 – 22 goals

Preston Makedonia Top Goalscorer
1982 – 11 goals

Fawkner Top Goalscorer
1987 – 14 goals
1988 – 8 goals

Australia B Leading Goalscorer
1984 – 2 goals

Career statistics

Club

International

International goals
Scores and results list Australia B's goal tally first.

References

1958 births
Living people
Sportspeople from Poole
Footballers from Dorset
Australian soccer players
Australia B international soccer players
English footballers
English emigrants to Australia
Australian people of Scottish descent
English people of Scottish descent
Anglo-Scots
Association football forwards
Scottish Football League players
English expatriate footballers
English Football League players
Aberdeen F.C. players
Clydebank F.C. (1965) players
Sheffield United F.C. players
National Soccer League (Australia) players
Preston Lions FC players
South Melbourne FC players
Heidelberg United FC players
Footballers from Airdrie, North Lanarkshire